On 21 August 2016, a double suicide bombing occurred in Galkayo, Mudug, Somalia. It killed 20 people and injured another 30. The first was a truck bombing which targeted local government headquarters in the city. The second was a car bombing which targeted the emergency services responding to the first bombing. Islamist group al-Shabaab claimed responsibility for the double bombing.

Al-Shabaab also carried out mass murders in Galkayo on 26 November 2018 and 21 December 2019.

References

2016 murders in Somalia
21st-century mass murder in Somalia
Al-Shabaab (militant group) attacks
Attacks on buildings and structures in 2016
Attacks on buildings and structures in Somalia
Attacks on government buildings and structures
August 2016 crimes in Africa
August 2016 events in Africa
2016 bombings
Islamic terrorist incidents in 2016
Suicide bombings in 2016
Suicide car and truck bombings in Somalia
Terrorist incidents in Somalia in 2016
Building bombings in Somalia